Donald Coleman (20 May 1927 – 15 August 1983) was a New Zealand cricketer. He played 31 first-class matches for Auckland between 1948 and 1958.

See also
 List of Auckland representative cricketers

References

External links
 

1927 births
1983 deaths
New Zealand cricketers
Auckland cricketers
Cricketers from Auckland